USS Snyder (DE-745) was a  built for the United States Navy during World War II.  She served in the Pacific Ocean and provided escort service against submarine and air attack for Navy vessels and convoys.

She was laid down on 28 April 1943 by the Western Pipe and Steel Company, San Pedro, Los Angeles; launched on 29 August 1943, sponsored by Mrs. Lillian J. Snyder; and commissioned on 5 May 1944.

World War II Pacific Theatre operations

After undergoing shakedown in the San Diego area, Snyder sailed to San Francisco in early July.  The destroyer escort joined Task Unit (TU) 16.1.5 there and departed for Pearl Harbor on 11 July. From 1 August to 6 October 1944, Snyder made escort tries to Enewetak Atoll, Manus Island, Saipan, and Kwajalein Atoll.  She joined Task Group (TG) 12.3 and conducted hunter-killer operations on the San Francisco-Pearl Harbor-Eniwetok sea lanes until mid-February 1945.

Snyder's task group spent much of March searching for Lt. Gen. Millard Harmon, Commanding General, United States Army Air Forces, Pacific Ocean Areas, whose plane was lost at sea. She then resumed hunter-killer operations. In May, the escort joined a convoy en route from Saipan to Okinawa. The escort then joined the picket screen around Okinawa until 29 May. From 2 to 23 June, Snyder operated with Task Unit 31.1.1, composed of seven escort carriers, which was providing air support for American forces fighting on southern Okinawa. In July and August, she performed anti-submarine patrols in the waters near Guam.

Post-War operations

When hostilities with the Empire of Japan ceased, Snyder proceeded to Saipan.  On 18 September, she screened a convoy of 21 transports from Saipan to Nagasaki.  On 18 October, the ship sailed for the West Coast of the United States via Pearl Harbor.  She was rerouted to the east coast for decommissioning and arrived at Norfolk, Virginia, in December 1945. She was then towed to Green Cove Springs, Florida where she lay with the reserve fleet until October 1946.

Service as Training Ship 

On 10 October, Snyder was towed to New York City and placed in commission, in reserve, as a training ship for the 3rd Naval District. She served in this capacity until May 1950, when she was placed in full commission for use in the Reserve Training Program. On 1 July 1957, Snyder was transferred to the Destroyer Force, Atlantic Fleet, but continued to operate as a Naval Reserve training ship.

Final decommissioning 

Snyder was again placed in reserve, out of commission, on 5 May 1960 and berthed at Philadelphia, Pennsylvania. She was struck from the Navy Directory on 1 August 1972 and sold to North American Smelting Co. in Wilmington, Delaware, for scrap.

Awards  

Snyder received one battle star for World War II service.

See also
 USS Slater

References

External links

 

Cannon-class destroyer escorts of the United States Navy
Ships built in Los Angeles
1943 ships
World War II frigates and destroyer escorts of the United States